Taj: Divided by Blood is an Indian period drama streaming television series produced by Contiloe Pictures for ZEE5. The series stars Dharmendra, Naseeruddin Shah, Rahul Bose, Aditi Rao Hydari, Zarina Wahab, Sandhya Mridul, Aashim Gulati and Taaha Shah in primary roles. The series premiered on ZEE5 on March 3, 2023.  It is produced by Abhimanyu Singh, Roopali Singh & William Borthwick and  Its shooting was wrapped up nearly in the last month of 2022.

Premise 
Set in the 16th century, the story follows Akbar and the war of succession amongst his 3 sons: Salim, Murad, and Daniyal. It is a twisted tale of the struggle for power filled with dangerous politics, poetic beauty, torrid romances, cold treachery, and bloodshed. The show unravels multiple layers of each character in the Mughal dynasty. The series dramatizes the rise and fall of the various generations of the Mughal Empire, showcasing both the beauty as well as the brutality of the dynasty.

Cast
 Dharmendra as Shaikh Salim Chisti
 Naseeruddin Shah as Akbar
 Aaryama Salim as Young Akbar
 Aditi Rao Hydari as Anarkali
 Sandhya Mridul as Jodha Bai
 Rahul Bose as Mirza Muhammad Hakim
 Zarina Wahab  as Salima Sultan Begum
 Aashim Gulati as Salim
 Taaha Shah as Murad
 Shubham Kumar Mehra as Daniyal Mirza
 Pankaj Saraswant as Abul Fazal
 Anushka Luhar as Man Bai
 ActorsFirdaush as Hakim Hasan  
 Tanvi Negi as Jagat Gossain
 Jaanam Raaj as Sahib Jamal
 Subodh Bhave as Birbal
 Akshat Mishra as Durjan
 Pawan Chopra as Giyas Beg
 Padma Damodaran as Ruqaiya Sultan Begum
 Shivani Tanksale as Bakht-un-Nissa Begum
 Aayam Mehta as Badayuni
 Deepraj Rana as Maharana Pratap
 Zachary Coffin as Father Monserrate
 Sauyma Setia as young Mehrunnisa
 Saurabh Selwal as young Asaf Khan

Production 
The show was first announced in 2018.

Release 
The series premiered on ZEE5 on 3 March 2023.

Promotion 
The peek into the show was released by Dharmendra, when he shared that he is playing Sheikh Salim Chisti in this show.
The logo was unveiled at a ceremony in Mumbai on February 14. Subsequently, the trailer was launched on February 17.

Reception 
Shubhra Gupta of The Indian Express wrote "From the fifth episode on, you can see the series lose steam. The writing, which had kept us engaged till then, starts getting repetitive, which leads to the flaws which we had managed to ignore demanding our attention." Syed Firdaus Ashraf of Rediff.com rated 1.5/5 stars and wrote "Naseeruddin Shah, who plays Akbar, looks thoroughly disinterested as if he is only playing the part for a hefty fee. Rahul Bose is a complete misfit playing the jihadi Mirza Muhammad Hakim South Mumbai style. Aditi Rao Hydari as Anarkali looks lost and is unconvincing in her love for Salim."

Saibal Chatterjee of NDTV rated the series 2.5 stars out of 5 and wrote "Taj: Divided by Blood is crafted with diligence. Parts of the show are informed with enough drama and intrigue to perk things up. It, however, frequently feels a touch strained and repetitive. It is neither Mughal-e-Azam nor Game of Thrones."

Shilajit Mitra for The Hindu wrote "We get a mammoth battle sequence in Kabul near the start. Though immensely staged, it bored me to bits with its obvious choreography (first the archers come on, then the infantry, then the cannonballs...). Far more memorable, then, is this exchange between Akbar and his ministers, after he announces his plans for ‘Din-I-Illahi’. They look crestfallen until one of them calls for a change in conventional thinking."

Suchandra Bose for The Quint rated 3.5 stars out of 5 and wrote "One of the major pitfalls of the show is its incapacity to dig a little deeper into the characters – Salim is an opium lover with a heart of gold, Jodha (Sandhya Mridul) is a concerned mother, Akbar is a ruthless ruler – their characterization can be condensed in three to four adjectives."

References

External links
 
 Taj: Divided By Blood at ZEE5

Hindi-language television shows
Mughal Empire in fiction
Indian action television series
Indian drama television series
Indian period television series
Family saga television series
Television series about dysfunctional families
2023 Indian television series debuts
Cultural depictions of Indian men
Cultural depictions of Indian women
Moghulistan
Khanate of Bukhara
History of India in fiction
Cultural depictions of Jahangir
Cultural depictions of Akbar